Melvin Thomas Runnels (January 28, 1934 – April 7, 2012) was an American football halfback in the National Football League for the Washington Redskins.  He played college football at the University of North Texas and was drafted in the fourteenth round of the 1956 NFL Draft by the Los Angeles Rams. He was born in Fort Worth, Texas and died in Granbury, Texas.

References

External links
Pro-Football reference

1934 births
2012 deaths
People from Fort Worth, Texas
American football halfbacks
North Texas Mean Green football players
Washington Redskins players
People from Granbury, Texas